"Rockin' on Heaven's Floor" is a song by German recording artist Jeanette. It was written by Frank Johnes, Tom Remm, Bodybrain, and Kristina "Wonderbra" Bach, and produced by Johnes and Remm for her fourth studio album Break On Through (2003). Released as a single in German-speaking Europe in October 2003, the rock and pop song peaked at number three on the German Singles Chart, while reaching number six in Austria and Switzerland, becoming Jeanette's highest-charting single and only top ten hit in Switzerland to date.

Formats and track listings

Charts

Weekly charts

Year-end charts

References

2003 songs
Jeanette Biedermann songs
Universal Music Group singles
Songs written by Kristina Bach